Chloroselas esmeralda, the Somali gem, is a butterfly in the family Lycaenidae. It is found in Somalia, Ethiopia, Kenya, Uganda, Tanzania, Yemen and Oman. The habitat consists of arid savanna.

The larvae possibly feed on Acacia tortilis.

Subspecies
Chloroselas esmeralda esmeralda (Somalia, Ethiopia, Kenya, western Uganda, northern Tanzania)
Chloroselas esmeralda bilqis Larsen, 1983 (Yemen, Oman: Dhofar)

References

External links
Die Gross-Schmetterlinge der Erde 13: Die Afrikanischen Tagfalter. Plate XIII 69 g

Butterflies described in 1886
Chloroselas
Butterflies of Africa
Taxa named by Arthur Gardiner Butler